Austroglossus microlepis, or the West coast sole, is a sea fish that is endemic to South Africa and is found from Namibia to False Bay.

References

External links 
 

Soleidae
Endemic fish of South Africa